Capital Dock is a 22-storey mixed-use development at the junction of Sir John Rogerson's Quay and Britain Quay in the Dublin docklands. Developed by Kennedy Wilson, the site was acquired in 2012 and construction finished in 2018. Upon completion, the 79-metre tower became the tallest storeyed building in the Republic of Ireland, and the third tallest on the island of Ireland.

History 

The building was developed in a joint venture with the National Asset Management Agency (NAMA) on the site of the proposed U2 Tower. Concrete foundations, as well as three floors below street level and one above level, had been completed on the original development before it was cancelled.

In 2012, Kennedy Wilson acquired the site and development started at the end of 2014. In May 2017, they sold the  200 Capital Dock building to JPMorgan on a forward funding sale agreement. In December 2017, Kennedy Wilson signed a 20-year lease with Indeed, to fully occupy buildings 100 and 300 Capital Dock.

Retail tenants include Fresh, BrewDog, Freshii and the Art of Coffee.

References 

Buildings and structures in Dublin (city)
Commercial buildings completed in 2018
2018 establishments in Ireland
Skyscraper office buildings in the Republic of Ireland
Office buildings in the Republic of Ireland
Dublin Docklands
Skyscrapers in the Republic of Ireland
Apartment buildings in the Republic of Ireland
21st-century architecture in the Republic of Ireland